Darach Mac Con Iomaire is an Irish actor, writer and director.

Mac Con Iomaire has written and directed four episodes of Corp agus Anam in 2011, and wrote an episode of another TV series, Síol, broadcast in 2010. He has acted in the 2002 short film, Padraig agus Nadia, and as Harry Lyons in a 1996 episode of Ros na Rún. He works almost exclusively in the Irish language.  Although raised in Dublin, his father is from Connemara and Irish was spoken at home.  The family also spent their holidays in Galway.

Darach Mac Con Iomaire is a former artistic director of An Taibhdhearc, the national Irish language theatre, and a winner of the Walter Macken Memorial Award.

References

External links
 Interview with Mac Con Iomaire, 7 June 2016.
 Profile, irishplayography.com; accessed 22 July 2020.
 
 Get writing as Gaeilge (archive.org copy), 19 November 2008 

Irish film directors
21st-century Irish male actors
People from County Galway
Living people
Irish television writers
Irish-language writers
Irish male film actors
Year of birth missing (living people)
Male television writers